The 2014–15 Magyar Kupa (English: Hungarian Cup) was the 75th season of Hungary's annual knock-out cup football competition. It started with the first match of the first round on 7 August 2014 and  ended with the final held in May 2015 at Ferenc Puskás Stadium, Budapest. Újpest are the defending champions, having won their ninth cup competition last season. The winner of the competition will qualify for the second qualifying round of the 2015–16 UEFA Europa League.

Round of 128
Matches were played on 7, 9, 10, 12, & 13 August 2014 and involved the teams qualified through the local cup competitions during the previous season, Nemzeti Bajnokság III, Nemzeti Bajnokság II, and the Nemzeti Bajnokság I teams.

|-
| colspan="3" style="background:#fcc;"|7 August 2014

|-
| colspan="3" style="background:#fcc;"|9 August 2014

 

|-
| colspan="3" style="background:#fcc;"|10 August 2014

|-
| colspan="3" style="background:#fcc;"|12 August 2014

|-
| colspan="3" style="background:#fcc;"|13 August 2014

 

|-
| colspan="3" style="background:#fcc;"|27 August 2014

|}

Round of 64

|-
| colspan="3" style="background:#fcc;"|2 September 2014

|-
| colspan="3" style="background:#fcc;"|9 September 2014

 
|-
| colspan="3" style="background:#fcc;"|10 September 2014

|}

Round of 32

|-
| colspan="3" style="background:#fcc;"|23 September 2014

|-
| colspan="3" style="background:#fcc;"|24 September 2014

|}

Round of 16

|-
| colspan="3" style="background:#fcc;"|28 October 2014

|-
| colspan="3" style="background:#fcc;"|29 October 2014

|}

Quarter-finals

First leg

Second leg

Semi-final

First leg

Second leg

Final

See also
 2014–15 Nemzeti Bajnokság I
 2014–15 Nemzeti Bajnokság II
 2014–15 Ligakupa

References

External links
 Official site 
 soccerway.com

2014–15 in Hungarian football
2014–15 European domestic association football cups
2014-15